Mohammed Al-Qarni (born 24 November 1989) is a Saudi Arabian football player who currently plays for Al-Wehda as a midfielder.

Honours
Al Hilal:
 Saudi Professional League (2): 2010, 2011
 King Cup (1): 2015
 Crown Prince Cup (5): 2010, 2011, 2012, 2013, 2016
 Saudi Super Cup (1): 2015
 AFC Champions League: Runner-up 2014

References

External links
 
 Saudi League Profile

1989 births
Living people
Al Hilal SFC players
Al-Qadsiah FC players
Al-Shabab FC (Riyadh) players
Al-Wehda Club (Mecca) players
Al Batin FC players
Saudi Professional League players
Saudi Arabian footballers
Association football midfielders